Domingo Nicolás Fuentes Zegarra (20 December 1941 – 28 October 2015) was a Peruvian footballer who played as a left-back.

Career
Fuentes played for Atlético Chalaco, Universitario de Deportes, Defensor Lima and Sporting Cristal. With Universitario he won the Peruvian Primera División in 1964, 1966, 1967, and 1969.

He made 17 appearances for the Peru national football team from 1965 to 1971, including playing at the 1970 FIFA World Cup.

Death
Fuentes died on 28 October 2015 at the age of 73 due to lung disease.

Honours
Universitario
 Peruvian Primera División: 1964, 1966, 1967, 1969

References

1941 births
2015 deaths
Association football fullbacks
Peruvian footballers
Peru international footballers
Atlético Chalaco footballers
Club Universitario de Deportes footballers
Sporting Cristal footballers
1970 FIFA World Cup players